Until Death Call My Name is the debut studio album by American rapper YoungBoy Never Broke Again. It was released on April 27, 2018, by Never Broke Again and Atlantic Records. The album features guest appearances from Future and Birdman, along with Lil Uzi Vert and Offset on the reloaded version.

Background
The album's title and original release date was announced on January 6, 2018. The album was originally slated for a March 2, 2018 release, however the release date was pushed back to April 27, 2018.

The album was made available for pre-order on Apple Music on January 6, 2018.

Singles
The album's lead single, "Outside Today", was released on January 6, 2018 to streaming services, along with its music video. The song peaked at number 31 on the Billboard Hot 100, becoming YoungBoy's highest charting song to date.

The album's second single, "Diamond Teeth Samurai", was released to streaming services on April 2, 2018, along with its music video. It debuted at number 59 on the Billboard Hot 100.

Critical reception

Until Death Call My Name received mediocre reviews from music critics. Paul Simmons from AllMusic stated that YoungBoy's "intense, unrelenting music details the harrowing violence he's experienced, as well as inflicted upon others." Just Ivey from HipHopDX noted that "The hard-living youngster’s speedy entry into parenthood — spurred on by fathering multiple children before even being able to legally drink alcohol — is one reason for his search for atonement." This was followed by a full review where he stated, "Until Death Call My Name, much like its creator, has its issues but beams with promise. YoungBoy is extremely polished for his age, which would normally bode well for a burgeoning artist." Sheldon Pearce from Pitchfork began his review by stating that "YoungBoy Never Broke Again, is a meditation on violence, the pangs of conscience, and the ways anticipating an early grave can tint perspective." He notes that "On more than one occasion on the album, YoungBoy characterizes himself as a demon or a devil or a reaper, as if to acknowledge the all-consuming darkness that lives within him." Pearce concludes his review by stating that "At the very least, though, Until Death provides plenty of insight into the perilous environments that condition young thugs. “Villain,” in which he embraces his inner demons and violent nature."

Commercial performance
Until Death Call My Name debuted at number seven on the US Billboard 200 chart, earning 43,000 album-equivalent units, (including 8,000 traditional album sales) in its first week. This became Youngboy's first US top-ten debut. On January 25, 2019, the album was certified platinum by the Recording Industry Association of America (RIAA) for combined sales and album-equivalent units on over a million units in the United States.

Track listing

Notes
  signifies an uncredited co-producer.
 The track Diamond Teeth Samurai interpolates 'Tha Block is Hot' by Lil Wayne, Juvenile, and B.G.

Charts

Weekly charts

Year-end charts

Certifications

References

2018 debut albums
YoungBoy Never Broke Again albums
Albums produced by Drumma Boy
Albums produced by TM88
Atlantic Records albums